Gjin Progoni was an archon (or lord) of Kruja, located in present-day Albania, from c. 1198 until his death in 1208. He succeeded his father, Progon of Kruja, becoming the second ruler of the House of Progon. Gjin was succeeded by his younger brother Dhimitër Progoni.

See also
History of Albania
Monarchs of Albania

References

Citations

Sources

12th-century births
1208 deaths
Gjin
Gjin
Gjin
Medieval Albanian nobility
12th-century Albanian people
13th-century Albanian people